A piping and instrumentation diagram (P&ID or PID) is a detailed diagram in the process industry which shows the piping and process equipment together with the instrumentation and control devices.

Superordinate to the P&ID is the process flow diagram (PFD) which indicates the more general flow of plant processes and the relationship between major equipment of a plant facility.

Contents and function

A piping and instrumentation diagram (P&ID) is defined as follows:
 A diagram which shows the interconnection of process equipment and the instrumentation used to control the process. In the process industry, a standard set of symbols is used to prepare drawings of processes. The instrument symbols used in these drawings are generally based on International Society of Automation (ISA) Standard S5.1
 The primary schematic drawing used for laying out a process control installation.

They usually contain the following information:

 Mechanical equipment, including:
Pressure vessels, columns, tanks, pumps, compressors, heat exchangers, furnaces, wellheads, fans, cooling towers, turbo-expanders, pig traps (see 'symbols' below)
Bursting discs, restriction orifices, strainers and filters, steam traps, moisture traps, sight-glasses, silencers, flares and vents, flame arrestors, vortex breakers, eductors

Process piping, sizes and identification, including:
Pipe classes and piping line numbers
Flow directions
Interconnections references
Permanent start-up, flush and bypass lines
Pipelines and flowlines
Blinds and spectacle blinds
Insulation and heat tracing
Process control instrumentation and designation (names, numbers, unique tag identifiers), including:
Valves and their types and identifications (e.g. isolation, shutoff, relief and safety valves, valve interlocks)
Control inputs and outputs (sensors and final elements, interlocks)
Miscellaneous - vents, drains, flanges, special fittings, sampling lines, reducers and swages
Interfaces for class changes
Computer control system
Identification of components and subsystems delivered by others

P&IDs are originally drawn up at the design stage from a combination of process flow sheet data, the mechanical process equipment design, and the instrumentation engineering design.  During the design stage, the diagram also provides the basis for the development of system control schemes, allowing for further safety and operational investigations, such as a Hazard and operability study (HAZOP). To do this, it is critical to demonstrate the physical sequence of equipment and systems, as well as how these systems connect.

P&IDs also play a significant role in the maintenance and modification of the process after initial build. Modifications are red-penned onto the diagrams and are vital records of the current plant design.

They are also vital in enabling development of;
Control and shutdown schemes
Safety and regulatory requirements
Start-up sequences
Operational understanding.

P&IDs form the basis for the live mimic diagrams displayed on graphical user interfaces of large industrial control systems such as SCADA and distributed control systems.

Identification and reference designation
Based on STANDARD ANSI/ISA S5.1 and ISO 14617-6, the P&ID is used for the identification of measurements within the process. The identifications consist of up to 5 letters. The first identification letter is for the measured value, the second is a modifier, 3rd indicates passive/readout function, 4th - active/output function, and the 5th is the function modifier. This is followed by loop number, which is unique to that loop. For instance FIC045 means it is the Flow Indicating Controller in control loop 045. This is also known as the "tag" identifier of the field device, which is normally given to the location and function of the instrument. The same loop may have FT045 - which is the flow transmitter in the same loop.

For reference designation of any equipment in industrial systems the standard IEC 61346 (Industrial systems, installations and equipment and industrial products — Structuring principles and reference designations) can be applied. For the function  Measurement the reference designator B is used, followed by the above listed letter for the measured variable.

For reference designation of any equipment in a power station the KKS Power Plant Classification System can be applied.

Symbols of chemical apparatus and equipment
Below are listed some symbols of chemical apparatus and equipment normally used in a P&ID, according to ISO 10628 and ISO 14617.

Historical use 
Prior to the advent of computer-aided design (CAD) in the late 1980s, P&IDs were drawn by hand. The drawing template shown below, actual size 225 mm by 111 mm, is typical of those used to draw P&IDs.

Piping and instrumentation diagram manual drawing template (1980s). Symbol key:

See also
Instrumentation in petrochemical industries

External links
 Commons:Category:Chemical engineering symbols - A list of P&ID symbols in SVG format

Process engineering
Piping
Diagrams
Industrial automation
 Learn How to Read P&ID Drawings – A Complete Guide
 Interpreting Piping and Instrumentation Diagrams-Symbology